Metomkin may refer to:

Places
Metomkin Island, a barrier island in Virginia

Ships
, the name of more than one United States Navy ship